Héctor Sanabria might refer to:

 Héctor Sanabria (footballer, born 1945), Mexican footballer
 Héctor Sanabria (footballer, born 1985), Argentine footballer